Meelis is a historical novel by Estonian author Enn Kippel. It was first published in 1941.

It talks about the adventures of a boy called Meelis, the son of Sakala's elder Lembitu.

References

Estonian novels
Historical novels
1941 novels